Rob Gerard Marie Derikx (born 25 August 1982 in Den Bosch, North Brabant) is a field hockey player from the Netherlands, who won the silver medal with the Dutch national squad at the 2004 Summer Olympics in Athens.

The midfielder made his debut on April 18, 2001 in a friendly match against Germany: where the score was 2-3. He played for Stichtse Cricket en Hockey Club in the Dutch League (Hoofdklasse), after a long time spell with HC Den Bosch. His older brother Geert-Jan is also a member of the Dutch field hockey squad. In 2003 he was nominated by the International Hockey Federation (FIH) for the Talent of the Year Award.

References
sports-reference

External links
 

1982 births
Living people
Dutch male field hockey players
Male field hockey midfielders
Olympic field hockey players of the Netherlands
2002 Men's Hockey World Cup players
Field hockey players at the 2004 Summer Olympics
Field hockey players at the 2008 Summer Olympics
Olympic silver medalists for the Netherlands
Sportspeople from 's-Hertogenbosch
Olympic medalists in field hockey
Medalists at the 2004 Summer Olympics
SCHC players
HC Den Bosch players
20th-century Dutch people
21st-century Dutch people